Theodore Francis Mullen Waters (November 17, 1902 – March 29, 1966) was an American Negro league outfielder in the 1920s.

A native of Marion, Maryland, Waters made his Negro leagues debut in 1925 with the Bacharach Giants. He went on to play for the Hilldale Club and the Philadelphia Tigers. Waters died in Philadelphia, Pennsylvania in 1966 at age 63.

References

External links
 and Seamheads

1902 births
1966 deaths
Bacharach Giants players
Hilldale Club players
Philadelphia Tigers players
Baseball outfielders
Baseball players from Maryland
People from Somerset County, Maryland
20th-century African-American sportspeople